The 1973 Intercontinental Cup was an association football match played on 28 November 1973 between Juventus, runners-up of the 1972–73 European Cup, and Independiente, winners of the 1973 Copa Libertadores. The match was played at the Stadio Olimpico in Rome. It was Juventus' first appearance into the competition and Independiente's fourth appearance after the defeats against Internazionale in 1964 and 1965 and against Ajax in 1972. Despite initially refusing to participate in the competition, Juventus replaced Ajax as representative UEFA team in the competition after Ajax as the European champions declined to contest a possible meeting in South America officially for financial reasons. The Cup was played in a single match instead of a two-legged final as happened in the previous and following years until 1979.

Background
Independiente was the 1973 Copa Libertadores title holder after beating Chilean club Colo-Colo with a goal in extra time. The Intercontinental Cup was a long longing for the club so they had lost the previous final v Dutch team Ajax –led by Johan Cruyff, most of its players would were part of the Netherlands national team that showed the revolutionary tactical theory (called the "total Football") at the 1974 FIFA World Cup – just one year before and had the opportunity to take revenge of that defeat. Nevertheless, the Dutch club refused to play the 1973 edition alleging they didn't want to suffer the "rough game" of the Argentine team again. Therefore, the runner-up of 1972–73 European Cup, Juventus, took Ajax's place to contest the competition. The Italian club refused to come to Buenos Aires, putting as a condition to play a unique match at Rome. Independiente executives accepted it, scheduling the match for November 28, 1973.

José Pastoriza, who had been the captain and leader of the Copa Libertadores winning team, did not play the match because he was transferred to AS Monaco short before the final in Rome.

Match

Summary

During the match, dominated by the Italian team, the Bianconeri had several opportunities to take the lead with two shots on the cross, a penalty kick, drawn by Cuccureddu, ended up over the bar and a shot in the last minutes of the race, which was blocked by the goalkeeper Santoro in daring action. Ten minutes from the end, an own goal by Gentile in a Bochini's shot, the only significant offensive action made by Independiente in the match, was decisive for the victory of the Diablos Rojos ("Red Devils").

Details

Aftermath

It was the first Intercontinental Cup won by Independiente (and the third won by an Argentine club after Racing and Estudiantes de La Plata success in 1967 and 1968 respectively). The victory was largely celebrated by Independiente fans due to the importance given to that competition in Argentina.

The victory was also the breakthrough of 19-year old Ricardo Bochini as a raising star. Bochini would continue and finish his career always playing for Independiente, becoming one of the greatest idols in the history of the club. On the other hand, the other keyplayer of the match, Daniel Bertoni, would then win the first FIFA World Cup with Argentina in 1978, also scoring the third goal v Netherlands in the final.

In their own words
The following phrases are extracted from an interview to Ricardo Bochini, Daniel Bertoni and Francisco Sá, three of Independiente players that won the Cup in 1973:

The lost video
Although the match was broadcast by Canal 7 in Argentina, it is believed that the video containing the images of the match could have been erased or stolen during the military dictatorship that governed from 1976. As those images were lost, the interest of Independiente fans and journalist in the match was increasing as years were by.

On the basis on some Independiente members (with then president of the institution Javier Cantero among them) initiative, the search for the video started. After some contacts with RAI (the Italian broadcasting company that had aired the match in 1973), they provided a copy of the film to musical producer (and Independiente fan) Mariano Asch, putting as condition it had to be returned after being used in Argentina.

In 2009, the 3-minute long copy of the video was aired for the first time during a celebration in Teatro Roma of Avellaneda held to commemorate the 35th. anniversary of the victory. Independiente legend Ricardo Bochini (who scored the goal at the final in 1973) was the star guest attending the event.

See also
1972–73 European Cup
1973 Copa Libertadores
Juventus F.C. in European football

References

Intercontinental Cup
Intercontinental Cup
Intercontinental Cup
1973
Intercontinental Cup 1973
Intercontinental Cup 1973
Intercontinental Cup 1973
Intercontinental Cup
November 1973 sports events in Europe
Sports competitions in Rome
1970s in Rome